Pseudocolaspis femorata is a species of leaf beetle of South Africa and the Democratic Republic of the Congo. It was first described by Joseph Sugar Baly in 1878.

References

Eumolpinae
Beetles of the Democratic Republic of the Congo
Beetles described in 1878
Taxa named by Joseph Sugar Baly
Insects of South Africa